I Want to Be Free may refer to:

 "I Want to Be Free" (Elvis Presley song), a song by Elvis Presley
 "I Want to Be Free" (Toyah song), a song by Toyah
 "I Want to Be Free", a song by Ohio Players from the album Fire
 "I Want to Be Free", a song by Ellie Holcomb from the album As Sure as the Sun

See also
 I Wanna Be Free (disambiguation)